The 2008 Haltemprice and Howden by-election was a by-election held in the United Kingdom on 10 July 2008 to elect a new Member of Parliament (MP) for constituency of Haltemprice and Howden. The by-election was triggered by the surprise and controversial resignation from the House of Commons of the sitting MP David Davis on 12 June 2008. Davis's stated intention was to spark a wider public debate on the perceived erosion of civil liberties in the UK by re-contesting his seat on this single issue platform, launched as the David Davis for Freedom campaign. The two other main political parties, Labour and the Liberal Democrats, declined to field candidates; the Liberal Democrats as they supported Davis in this issue and Labour as they considered the election a "political stunt".

Davis was subsequently re-elected to his seat as a Conservative with 72% of the vote. He received 17,113 votes, with the closest challenge coming from the Green Party and English Democrats with 1,758 and 1,714 votes respectively. All other candidates lost their deposit due to polling less than 5% of the vote. Due to the unusual circumstances, the election broke several records, including the most candidates running in a UK parliamentary by-election – 26, the largest number of independents, the largest number of people losing their deposits and the best by-election, until then, for the Green Party and English Democrats.

While single issue by-elections such as this one were not unprecedented, they were rare in modern political times. Under election law, other candidates were free to stand on their chosen manifesto and not necessarily obliged to oppose or support Davis. Davis's use of a by-election in this way attracted both praise and criticism from politicians, the public and the media, with The Sun newspaper initially considering fielding a candidate to oppose Davis in support of anti-terrorism legislation. The Labour Party's non-participation stance attracted specific criticism as appearing to be afraid to debate, following recent poor election results and a record low opinion poll result; while Davis attracted criticism as being vain, wasting public money, as well as for contesting the issue in his safe seat.

Background

Constituency 
The UK Parliament constituency of Haltemprice and Howden is located in the East Riding of Yorkshire, which is in the Yorkshire and the Humber region of England. The seat is split evenly between residential and rural areas. The constituency covers a large, wide area that stretches from the border of Kingston Upon Hull in the east to the market town of Howden in the west and northwards to the village of Holme-on-Spalding-Moor near York. Most of the population is centred in the villages of Willerby, Kirk Ella, Anlaby and Cottingham, which were part of the former district of Haltemprice.

Campaign 

Davis, the then Shadow Home Secretary, announced his intention to resign on 12 June 2008, a day after a House of Commons vote passed the Counter-Terrorism Bill, which would extend the legal detention of terror suspects without charge to a maximum of 42 days.
Explaining his actions, Davis stated he intended to spark a wider public debate about the perceived erosion of civil liberties by the then Labour government, which in the following week was launched as the 'David Davis for Freedom campaign'. Culture Secretary Andy Burnham called on Davis to fund the cost of the by-election to the taxpayer, estimated at £80,000, from his own pocket.

Davis had held the seat as a Conservative since its creation in 1997, having previously been MP since 1987 for the predecessor seat of Boothferry. The Conservative position at the time of Davis's resignation aligned with Davis in opposing the 42-day extension vote, although Davis's decision to resign was characterised as personal and not a shadow cabinet decision, by Conservative leader David Cameron.

The by-election followed a heavy defeat for Labour in the Crewe and Nantwich by-election in May 2008 at the hands of the Conservative Party, who were previously the third party in this seat behind the second placed Liberal Democrats. The by-election also followed a previously failed attempt by the Liberal Democrats to target Davis as a high-profile seat in a 'decapitation' strategy against the Conservatives in the previous general election of 2005.

Analogous UK parliamentary elections

A small number of previous by-elections have been initiated when the sitting MP resigned on a point of principle and stood for immediate re-election. This has occurred three times since the Second World War, the Lincoln by-election in 1973 and the Mitcham and Morden by-election in 1982 when the sitting MPs changed parties, and in 1986 when fifteen Northern Irish MPs resigned in protest against the Anglo-Irish Agreement. In addition in 1955 Sir Richard Acland resigned with the intention to re-contest Gravesend as an independent in protest against the Labour Party's support for nuclear weapons, but the 1955 general election overtook events and he lost.

At the 1997 general election, neither Labour nor the Liberal Democrats stood against the Conservatives in the seat of Tatton, urging their supporters to back the independent Martin Bell, over the Cash-for-questions affair. Bell defeated Neil Hamilton and won the seat. In both the 2001 and 2005 general elections, the Liberal Democrats did not field a candidate in Wyre Forest, instead supporting the Health Concern candidate Richard Taylor.

Result
Polling took place on 10 July 2008.

Candidates
The East Riding of Yorkshire Council announced the accepted candidates on 26 June 2008. At 26, the number of candidates broke the record for a UK parliamentary by-election, previously held by the 1993 Newbury by-election, which had 19 candidates. The greatest number of candidates to have contested a UK general election seat is 15, at Sedgefield in 2005.

Due to the large number of candidates the ballot paper for this election was arranged in two columns. Also, the candidates stood in a line in front of a small platform with the returning officer on it, rather than on a temporary stage as is normally practised because it was feared that the stage would not take the weight of all the candidates.

Christian Party
George Hargreaves stood for the Christian Party and was leader of that party. The party website said "he is asking the Haltemprice and Howden electorate to use their vote to demand a referendum on the European Union, which he believes is the greatest threat to our civil liberties".

Church of the Militant Elvis Party
David Bishop was the candidate for the Church of the Militant Elvis Party. He previously stood for this party in Erewash in the 2005 United Kingdom general election and in Brentwood and Ongar in 2001.

Conservative
David Davis, MP for the constituency and its predecessor from 1987 until his resignation brought about the by-election, stood as the official Conservative Party candidate. He fought the campaign on the theme David Davis for Freedom.

English Democrats Party
The English Democrats Party selected Joanne Robinson as its candidate. She previously stood as the United Kingdom Independence Party candidate for the same constituency in the 2001 general election.

Freedom 4 Choice
Blackpool based Hamish Howitt was one of two pub landlords who announced intentions to stand under the "Freedom to Choose" label, opposing the smoking ban in England.

Green Party
Shan Oakes was the Green Party candidate. She was also the party's candidate in the 2009 European Parliament elections.

She stood on a civil rights platform, highlighting the measures supported by David Davis that she claimed threaten civil liberties, including his support for the death sentence. David Davis admitted that the Green Party were his most serious contenders in the by-election.

Make Politicians History
Ronnie Carroll, standing for Make Politicians History, was the party's leader and also a twice-defeated Eurovision Song Contest entrant. He stood in Hampstead and Highgate in the 1997 general election for the "Rainbow Dream Ticket", a predecessor of "Make Politicians History", and in the 1997 Uxbridge by-election for the ProLife Alliance. He told the VoteWise website he stands for liberating "ourselves from the governing classes, those lords of misrule".

Miss Great Britain Party
The Miss Great Britain Party candidate was Gemma Garrett, following her last place, as an Independent, at the earlier Crewe and Nantwich by-election. The party registered with the Electoral Commission after that election. Garrett expressed opposition to David Davis, declaring herself "happy to be locked up for 42 days if I am a suspect".

National Front
Tess Culnane was the National Front candidate; she was a 2004 London Assembly election candidate for the British National Party. and a 2008 London Assembly election candidate for the NF.

The New Party
David Pinder stood for The New Party. He said "Read my lips: what David Davis is saying is that Britain needs a new party".

Official Monster Raving Loony Party
The Official Monster Raving Loony Party's candidate was Rosalyn Warner, known as Mad Cow-Girl. She stood on an indefinite-detention platform, combined with a quote based on Douglas Adams's "Hitchhikers Guide to the Galaxy": "The answer is 42!!! Now we just need to figure out the real question!!!" On BBC Radio 4, they were reported as saying 'because the sensible parties are acting like lunatics in this election, we have decided to come up with sensible policies'. Later she remarked "I may be a loony but I'm not mad enough to want dangerous people to be walking the streets" She has previously stood in Sunderland South in the 2001 and 2005 general elections.

Socialist Equality Party
The Socialist Equality Party stood Chris Talbot as its candidate on a programme of "genuine" socialism with a particular emphasis on a defence of "democratic rights". He is a lecturer at the University of Huddersfield and contested South Wales Central in the 2007 National Assembly for Wales election.

Independent candidates

 David Craig (real name Neil Glass), former management consultant turned author critical of Gordon Brown stood as an independent candidate.
 Herbert Crossman stood in Harrow West in the 1997 United Kingdom general election for the Referendum Party. Crossman told the VoteWise website he wants to "make a difference to people's life's." {sic}
 Thomas Darwood has letters published on the themes of monarchy and religion on his web site.
 Tony Farnon told the VoteWise website his campaign was largely based on his personal anti-smoking and smoking addiction programme, and that smokers could use his "Winners Freedom Secrets".
 Eamonn Fitzpatrick, a Northampton market trader, stated that he would shut down his market stall for a month to campaign in favour of the government's 42-day detention plan. Fitzpatrick has run in elections before, standing in Northampton South. Kelvin MacKenzie urged his supporters and those in favour of 42 days detention to vote for Fitzpatrick. He received 31 votes
 Christopher Foren was the Leeds Crown Prosecutor.
 Jill Saward, a campaigner for rape law reform, stated in an article on her website that she would stand as a candidate against David Davis, in response to Davis "saying nothing at all" about sexual violence issues while serving as Shadow Home Secretary. She stated that the DNA Database should be extended to help detection of sexual assault, and that there was a disparity between the "thousands" of people affected by sexual assault each year, compared to the detention proposals of the Counter-Terrorism Bill which "may not affect anyone at all". In the early hours of 26 June she revealed that she would be standing in the election and later that afternoon she confirmed that her nomination papers had been accepted.
 Norman Scarth stood as "Anti Crime" in the 2007 Sedgefield by-election, where he came bottom of the poll with 34 votes. He had previously contested Chesterfield in the 1997 United Kingdom general election, as "Independent Old Age Pensioner"
 Walter Sweeney is the former Conservative MP for Vale of Glamorgan
 John Upex is a former United Kingdom Independence Party (UKIP) member, and was UKIP candidate in Wakefield in the 2005 United Kingdom general election
 Greg Wood had served as a doctor with the Royal Navy for sixteen years. His candidature was on the single issue of better care for the armed forces and veterans

Candidate with no ballot paper description
David Icke said he would stand for election under the slogan "Big Brother – the Big Picture", but that if elected he would refuse to take the oath of allegiance to the Queen in order to take up his seat. He opted to declare neither a party affiliation nor "Independent", so appeared on the ballot paper with no party label. Icke told the VoteWise website he had "no politics", and David Davis had a "lot he doesn't yet see".

Not standing

Liberal Democrats
Nick Clegg, the leader of the Liberal Democrats, announced that his party would not field a candidate in the by-election as the issue of civil liberties transcended party politics and the Liberal Democrats supported Davis's position on the issue, but he said that the party intended to contest the seat as normal at the next general election. The Liberal Democrats came second in the 2005 and 2010 general elections in this seat and fourth in the 2015 general election.

Labour Party
The Labour Party also declared that it would not contest the by-election. In the immediate aftermath of Davis's decision, Prime Minister Gordon Brown called the by-election a "farce", and Davis's opposite number, Home Secretary Jacqui Smith said the Conservative Party was in "disarray". In a statement on the Labour Party's website, NEC Chair, Dianne Hayter, said: "This is a phoney by-election that is completely unnecessary and the Labour Party will not be taking part in what is a political stunt".

UK Independence Party
The United Kingdom Independence Party (UKIP) did not contest the election. However, one UKIP MEP announced that he would campaign for David Davis if he also addressed issues related to the European Union during his campaign.

British National Party
The British National Party published that it foresaw the "possible...splintering" of the Conservatives, it supported Davis on "traditional British civil liberties", and on those two grounds, would not run.

News Corp
The editor of The Sun newspaper, Rebekah Wade and its proprietor Rupert Murdoch requested in the immediate days following Davis's decision that columnist Kelvin MacKenzie stand against Davis for election. MacKenzie stated "The Sun is very, very hostile to David Davis because of his 28-day stance and The Sun has always been very up for 42 days and perhaps even 420 days." In its editorial The Sun described Davis as deranged. MacKenzie said on 19 June 2008 that he would not be standing, primarily due to having no financial backing. He urged people to vote instead for Eamonn Fitzpatrick.

History

Constituency history
Davis held the seat, as a Conservative, since its creation in 1997, and held the predecessor seat of Boothferry from 1987. Its area has been covered by parts of (and partly at different times) by Boothferry, Howden, Haltemprice, Howdenshire and East Riding of Yorkshire, has been consistently represented by Conservative MPs since the 1837 general election.

Davis's majority fell to 4.3% in the 2001 general election; the seat became a Liberal Democrat target. Davis increased his majority to 10.7% in the 2005 general election.

By-election records
The nature of Davis's resignation resulted in a number of by-election records and unusual occurrences. Most notably, at 26, the election saw a record number of candidates and a record number of independent candidates standing for an election in the UK. 23 of them, including all independents, lost their deposit, also a record. The Labour Party's decision not to put forward a candidate meant this was the first Great British by-election since the Bristol South East in 1963 (in which the Conservative Party did not stand) in which the governing party has not stood a candidate and the first Great British by-election without a Labour candidate since the 1946 Combined English Universities by-election.

Davis's result saw the biggest increase in share of the vote, up 24.1%, for a Conservative by-election candidate since 1945. The Green Party and the English Democrats Party both gained record high by-election vote percentages at 7.4% and 7.2%, and second and third place respectively. This is also the highest percentage vote for the English Democrats at any parliamentary election.

References

External links
 Election leaflets from the by-election campaign

By-elections to the Parliament of the United Kingdom in Yorkshire and the Humber constituencies
Haltemprice and Howden by-election
Elections in the East Riding of Yorkshire
Haltemprice and Howden by-election
Haltemprice and Howden by-election
2000s in the East Riding of Yorkshire